Mock is a surname. Notable people with the surname include:

Alois Mock (1934–2017), Austrian politician
Chad Mock (born 1984), American football player
Chance Mock (born 1981), American football player
Freida Lee Mock, American film director and producer
Garrett Mock (born 1983), American baseball player
George Mock (1907–2001), American labor leader
Hans Mock (1906–1982), Austrian footballer
Janet Mock (born 1983), American author
Jerrie Mock (1925–2014), American aviator
John Mock, American musician
Karen Mock, Canadian activist
Owen Mock, American computer programmer
Richard Mock (1944–2006), American artist
Ron Mock, American Quaker
Sai Wing Mock (1879–1941), Chinese-American mob boss
Vanessa Mock (born 1975), German journalist

Fictional characters:
Eberhard Mock (1883–1960), fictional detective

See also
Manfred Möck (born 1959), German actor